Østbirk is a town, with a population of 2,413 (1 january 2022), in Horsens Municipality, Central Denmark Region, in Denmark, situated 11 km east of Brædstrup, 16 km southwest of Skanderborg and 15 km northwest of Horsens.

Østbirk Church, where the admiral and naval hero Peder Skram is buried, is located in the town.

References

Cities and towns in the Central Denmark Region